Store Blåmann or Blåmannen is a mountain in Tromsø Municipality in Troms og Finnmark county, Norway. At , it is the highest mountain on the island Kvaløya.

The mountain summit can be accessed without special climbing skills or equipment, but caution is advised on the last part of the climb, which can be difficult in wet conditions.

References

Tromsø
Mountains of Troms og Finnmark